Rommel Calls Cairo is a 1959 West German war thriller film directed by Wolfgang Schleif and starring Adrian Hoven, Elisabeth Müller and Peter van Eyck. It is based on a real incident from the North African Campaign during the Second World War.

The film's sets were designed by the art directors Ludwig Reiber and Hans Strobel. It was shot on location in Egypt.

Van Eyck reprised his role as László Almásy in the British film Foxhole in Cairo, which was released the following year.

Cast
 Adrian Hoven as Capt. Johannes Eppler, alias Hussein Gafaar
 Elisabeth Müller as Lt. Kay Morrison
 Peter van Eyck as Capt. Graf von Almassy
 Paul Klinger as Field Marshal Erwin Rommel
 Leila Iman as Amina
 Herbert Tiede as Col. Robertson
 Ernst Reinhold as Sandy
 Wolf Ackva as Maj. Smith
 Til Kiwe as Amis
 Saliman as Achmed
 Albert Hehn as Lüdinghausen
 Horst Uhse as Schmitz
 Siegfried Dornbusch as Schulze
 Gustl Weishappel as Gruber
 Manfred Andrae as Oberfeldwebel
 Werner Stock as Abele
 Heinz Lausch
 Lili Schoenborn-Anspach
 Panos Papadopulos as Sharani
 Karin Hauck as Leila
 Heinz Simon as Bachmann

References

Bibliography
 Davidson, John & Hake, Sabine. Framing the Fifties: Cinema in a Divided Germany. Berghahn Books, 2007.

External links 
 

1959 films
1959 war films
German war films
West German films
1950s German-language films
Films directed by Wolfgang Schleif
North African campaign films
World War II spy films
German multilingual films
1950s multilingual films
1950s German films